The Essex Fells School District is a community public school district that serves students in pre-kindergarten through sixth grade from Essex Fells, in Essex County, New Jersey, United States.

As of the 2018–19 school year, the district, comprised of one school, had an enrollment of 252 students and 32.4 classroom teachers (on an FTE basis), for a student–teacher ratio of 7.8:1.

The district is classified by the New Jersey Department of Education as being in District Factor Group "J," the highest of eight groupings. District Factor Groups organize districts statewide to allow comparison by common socioeconomic characteristics of the local districts. From lowest socioeconomic status to highest, the categories are A, B, CD, DE, FG, GH, I and J.

Students in public school for seventh through twelfth grades attend the West Essex Regional School District, a regional school district serving students from Essex Fells, Fairfield, North Caldwell and Roseland. Schools in the district (with 2018–19 enrollment data from the National Center for Education Statistics) are 
West Essex Middle School with 564 students in grades 7-8 and 
West Essex High School with 1,123 students in grades 9-12.

Awards and recognition
In 2016, the school was one of ten schools in New Jersey recognized as a National Blue Ribbon School by the United States Department of Education, a recognition celebrating excellence in academics.

School
Essex Fells School had an enrollment of 250 students in grades PreK-6 as of the 2018–19 school year.
Michelle V. Gadaleta, Principal

Administration
Core members of the district's administration are:
Michelle V. Gadaleta, Superintendent
Steven Lella, Business Administrator / Board Secretary

Board of education
The district's board of education, comprised of five members, sets policy and oversees the fiscal and educational operation of the district through its administration. As a Type II school district, the board's trustees are elected directly by voters to serve three-year terms of office on a staggered basis, with one or two seats up for election each year held (since 2012) as part of the November general election. The board appoints a superintendent to oversee the day-to-day operation of the district.

References

External links 
Essex Fells School
 
School Data for the Essex Fells School, National Center for Education Statistics
West Essex Regional School District

Essex Fells, New Jersey
New Jersey District Factor Group J
School districts in Essex County, New Jersey
Public elementary schools in New Jersey